Colón is a municipality in the Nariño Department, Colombia. The municipality head is the town of Génova.

Municipalities of Nariño Department